22 Orionis is a binary star in the equatorial constellation of Orion. It has the Bayer designation o Orionis, while 22 Orionis is the Flamsteed designation. This system is visible to the naked eye as a faint, blue-white hued star with an apparent visual magnitude of 4.74. It is located approximately 1,100 light years away from the Sun based on parallax. The system is moving further from the Earth with a heliocentric radial velocity of +28.80

This is a single-lined spectroscopic binary with an orbital period of 293 days and an eccentricity of 0.15. The visible member, component A, has a stellar classification of B2 IV-V, matching a B-type star with a luminosity class that displays mixed traits of a main sequence star and a subgiant. It is a suspected Beta Cephei variable or a slowly pulsating B star.

References

B-type main-sequence stars
B-type subgiants
Beta Cephei variables
Slowly pulsating B stars
Spectroscopic binaries
Orion (constellation)
Orionis, o
BD-00 0930
Orionis, 22
035039
025044
1765
Suspected variables